Stanyon is a surname. Notable people with the surname include:

Bryan Stanyon (born 1941), British actor 
Ellis Stanyon (1870–1951), British magician 

English toponymic surnames